Ezequiel Rétiz Gutiérrez (born 6 December 1973) is a Mexican politician from the National Action Party. From 2009 to 2012 he served as Deputy of the LXI Legislature of the Mexican Congress representing the Federal District.

References

1973 births
Living people
Politicians from Mexico City
National Action Party (Mexico) politicians
21st-century Mexican politicians
National Autonomous University of Mexico alumni
Members of the Congress of Mexico City
Deputies of the LXI Legislature of Mexico
Members of the Chamber of Deputies (Mexico) for Mexico City